Queer You Are is a Spanish television series created by Roberto Enríquez ("Bob Pop"), representing a partially fictionalized version of his personal experiences. Directed by Alejandro Marín, the six-episode series stars Gabriel Sánchez, Carlos González, Candela Peña and Alba Flores, among others. Produced by El Terrat, it premiered on TNT on 18 June 2021 and became available to HBO Max subscribers, with English subtitles, on 26 October 2021.

Premise 
Blending drama and comedy, the fiction is inspired by the life of the series' creator Roberto Enríquez (Bob Pop), intercutting events from his small-town youth as an overweight teenaged fan of musicals in the 1980s, with later experiences during his time as a university student in Madrid and his current life as a professional writer.

Cast

Production and release 
Berto Romero is credited as executive producer. Written by Bob Pop, the full six episodes were directed by Alejandro Marín. Filming lasted from October 2020 to February 2021. It took place in between the province of Barcelona (Barcelona, El Prat de Llobregat, Castelldefels, Terrassa and Sant Vicenç de Montalt) and Madrid. On 28 April 2021, the release date of 18 June 2021 for the first three episodes was disclosed, with the last three scheduled for 25 June. It was pre-screened at the Málaga Film Festival.

Episodes

Awards and nominations 

|-
| align = "center" rowspan = "2" | 2021 || 68th Ondas Awards || colspan = "2" | Best Comedy Series ||  || 
|-
| 27th Forqué Awards || colspan = "2" | Best Fiction Series ||  || 
|-
| align = "center" rowspan = "4" | 2022 || rowspan = "3" | 9th Feroz Awards || colspan = "2" | Best Comedy Series ||  || rowspan = "3" | 
|-
| Best Supporting Actor in a Series || Miguel Rellán || 
|-
| Best Supporting Actress in a Series || Candela Peña || 
|-
| 33rd GLAAD Media Awards || colspan = "2" | Outstanding Spanish-Language Scripted Television Series ||  || 
|}

References 

Television shows filmed in Spain
Television shows set in Madrid
Spanish-language television shows
Spanish LGBT-related television shows
TNT (Spanish TV channel) original programming
2021 Spanish television series debuts
2021 Spanish television series endings
2020s Spanish drama television series
2020s Spanish comedy television series
Spanish comedy-drama television series
2020s LGBT-related drama television series
2020s LGBT-related comedy television series